On 19 August 2018, the IUCN Red List of Threatened Species identified 4584 endangered species, subspecies, stocks and subpopulations.

Annelida

Clitellata

Megadrilaceae

Megascolecidae

Moniligastridae

Opisthopora

Octochaetidae

Arthropoda

Arachnida

Araneae

Araneidae

Barychelidae

Clubionidae

Lycosidae

Nephilidae

Oonopidae

Pholcidae

Salticidae

Scytodidae

Symphytognathidae

Telemidae

Tetrablemmidae

Tetragnathidae

Theraphosidae

Theridiidae

Thomisidae

Holothyrida

Holothyridae

Opiliones

Biantidae

Oncopodidae

Podoctidae

Samoidae

Oribatida

Scheloribatidae

Pseudoscorpiones

Atemnidae

Syarinidae

Tridenchthoniidae

Schizomida

Hubbardiidae

Scorpiones

Buthidae

Branchiopoda

Anostraca

Branchinectidae

Streptocephalidae

Thamnocephalidae

Notostraca

Triopsidae

Chilopoda

Geophilomorpha

Mecistocephalidae

Lithobiomorpha

Lithobiidae

Scutigeromorpha

Scutigeridae

Diplopoda

Polyzoniida

Siphonotidae

Siphonophorida

Siphonophoridae

Sphaerotheriida

Arthrosphaeridae

Zephroniidae

Spirobolida

Pachybolidae

Spirobolellidae

Spirostreptida

Spirostreptidae

Insecta

Archaeognatha

Machilidae

Blattodea

Blattellidae

Nocticolidae

Coleoptera

Anthicidae

Anthribidae

Buprestidae

Carabidae

Cerambycidae

Cicindelidae

Ciidae

Cleridae

Cucujidae

Curculionidae

Dytiscidae

Elateridae

Erotylidae

Geotrupidae

Latridiidae

Lucanidae

Scarabaeidae

Staphylinidae

Tenebrionidae

Trogossitidae

Zopheridae

Dermaptera

Carcinophoridae

Diptera

Blephariceridae

Psychodidae

Ephemeroptera

Oniscigastridae

Grylloblattodea

Grylloblattidae

Hemiptera

Cicadellidae

Cixiidae

Psyllidae

Hymenoptera

Andrenidae

Apidae

Colletidae

Halictidae

Melittidae

Lepidoptera

Argyresthiidae

Gelechiidae

Gracillariidae

Hesperiidae

Lycaenidae

Noctuidae

Nymphalidae

Papilionidae

Pieridae

Sphingidae

Stathmopodidae

Tineidae

Mantodea

Mantidae

Odonata

Aeshnidae

Argiolestidae

Austropetaliidae

Calopterygidae

Chlorocyphidae

Chlorogomphidae

Coenagrionidae

Cordulegastridae

Corduliidae

Euphaeidae

Gomphidae

Hemiphlebiidae

Heteragrionidae

Hypolestidae

Lestidae

Lestoideidae

Libellulidae

Macromiidae

Megapodagrionidae

Not Assigned

Petaluridae

Philogeniidae

Platycnemididae

Platystictidae

Synlestidae

Orthoptera

Acrididae

Dericorythidae

Euschmidtiidae

Gryllidae

Lentulidae

Mogoplistidae

Pamphagidae

Pneumoridae

Tetrigidae

Tettigoniidae

Trigonidiidae

Phasmatodea

Phasmatidae

Malacostraca

Amphipoda

Crangonyctidae

Gammaridae

Niphargidae

Paramelitidae

Talitridae

Decapoda

Alpheidae

Astacidae

Atyidae

Cambaridae

Desmocarididae

Euryrhynchidae

Gecarcinucidae

Palaemonidae

Parastacidae

Pinnotheridae

Potamidae

Potamonautidae

Pseudothelphusidae

Trichodactylidae

Typhlocarididae

Isopoda

Asellidae

Cirolanidae

Philosciidae

Sphaeromatidae

Stenasellidae

Chordata

Actinopterygii

Acipenseriformes

Acipenseridae

Anguilliformes

Anguillidae

Atheriniformes

Atherinidae

Atherinopsidae

Bedotiidae

Melanotaeniidae

Phallostethidae

Pseudomugilidae

Batrachoidiformes

Batrachoididae

Beloniformes

Adrianichthyidae

Hemiramphidae

Characiformes

Alestidae

Bryconidae

Characidae

Curimatidae

Distichodontidae

Parodontidae

Clupeiformes

Clupeidae

Engraulidae

Cypriniformes

Balitoridae

Catostomidae

Cobitidae

Cyprinidae

Ellopostomatidae

Psilorhynchidae

Cyprinodontiformes

Aplocheilidae

Cyprinodontidae

Fundulidae

Goodeidae

Nothobranchiidae

Poeciliidae

Profundulidae

Rivulidae

Gadiformes

Merlucciidae

Gasterosteiformes

Gasterosteidae

Gobiesociformes

Gobiesocidae

Gonorynchiformes

Kneriidae

Gymnotiformes

Gymnotidae

Mugiliformes

Mugilidae

Ophidiiformes

Bythitidae

Osmeriformes

Galaxiidae

Plecoglossidae

Osteoglossiformes

Mormyridae

Osteoglossidae

Perciformes

Anabantidae

Apogonidae

Badidae

Blenniidae

Centrarchidae

Cichlidae

Cirrhitidae

Clinidae

Eleotridae

Epinephelidae

Gobiidae

Labridae

Labrisomidae

Latidae

Malacanthidae

Odontobutidae

Osphronemidae

Percichthyidae

Percidae

Pomacanthidae

Pomacentridae

Rhyacichthyidae

Sciaenidae

Scombridae

Serranidae

Sparidae

Tripterygiidae

Xiphiidae

Pleuronectiformes

Pleuronectidae

Salmoniformes

Salmonidae

Scorpaeniformes

Scorpaenidae

Sebastidae

Siluriformes

Amblycipitidae

Amphiliidae

Anchariidae

Ariidae

Austroglanididae

Bagridae

Callichthyidae

Clariidae

Claroteidae

Heptapteridae

Ictaluridae

Loricariidae

Mochokidae

Pangasiidae

Pimelodidae

Schilbeidae

Siluridae

Sisoridae

Trichomycteridae

Synbranchiformes

Chaudhuriidae

Mastacembelidae

Synbranchidae

Syngnathiformes

Syngnathidae

Tetraodontiformes

Tetraodontidae

Amphibia

Anura

Alsodidae

Aromobatidae

Arthroleptidae

Batrachylidae

Bombinatoridae

Brevicipitidae

Bufonidae

Calyptocephalellidae

Centrolenidae

Ceratobatrachidae

Conrauidae

Craugastoridae

Cycloramphidae

Dendrobatidae

Dicroglossidae

Eleutherodactylidae

Heleophrynidae

Hemiphractidae

Hylidae

Hyperoliidae

Leptodactylidae

Limnodynastidae

Mantellidae

Megophryidae

Micrixalidae

Microhylidae

Myobatrachidae

Nasikabatrachidae

Nyctibatrachidae

Pelobatidae

Petropedetidae

Phrynobatrachidae

Pipidae

Ptychadenidae

Pyxicephalidae

Ranidae

Ranixalidae

Rhacophoridae

Sooglossidae

Telmatobiidae

Caudata

Ambystomatidae

Hynobiidae

Plethodontidae

Proteidae

Salamandridae

Gymnophiona

Herpelidae

Ichthyophiidae

Indotyphlidae

Rhinatrematidae

Scolecomorphidae

Aves

Accipitriformes

Accipitridae

Anseriformes

Anatidae

Bucerotiformes

Bucerotidae

Caprimulgiformes

Apodidae

Caprimulgidae

Trochilidae

Charadriiformes

Alcidae

Charadriidae

Haematopodidae

Laridae

Rostratulidae

Scolopacidae

Turnicidae

Ciconiiformes

Ciconiidae

Columbiformes

Columbidae

Coraciiformes

Alcedinidae

Cuculiformes

Cuculidae

Eurypygiformes

Rhynochetidae

Falconiformes

Falconidae

Galliformes

Cracidae

Megapodiidae

Odontophoridae

Phasianidae

Gruiformes

Gruidae

Heliornithidae

Psophiidae

Rallidae

Musophagiformes

Musophagidae

Otidiformes

Otididae

Passeriformes

Acanthisittidae

Acrocephalidae

Alaudidae

Atrichornithidae

Campephagidae

Cardinalidae

Cisticolidae

Corvidae

Cotingidae

Dasyornithidae

Dicruridae

Emberizidae

Estrildidae

Fringillidae

Furnariidae

Grallariidae

Hirundinidae

Hyliotidae

Hylocitreidae

Icteridae

Leiothrichidae

Locustellidae

Macrosphenidae

Malaconotidae

Maluridae

Meliphagidae

Mimidae

Mohouidae

Monarchidae

Motacillidae

Muscicapidae

Nectariniidae

Oriolidae

Pardalotidae

Paridae

Parulidae

Passerellidae

Pellorneidae

Petroicidae

Pittidae

Platysteiridae

Ploceidae

Pycnonotidae

Rhinocryptidae

Sittidae

Sturnidae

Thamnophilidae

Thraupidae

Tityridae

Troglodytidae

Turdidae

Tyrannidae

Vangidae

Vireonidae

Zosteropidae

Pelecaniformes

Ardeidae

Threskiornithidae

Piciformes

Bucconidae

Lybiidae

Picidae

Ramphastidae

Podicipediformes

Podicipedidae

Procellariiformes

Diomedeidae

Hydrobatidae

Oceanitidae

Procellariidae

Psittaciformes

Cacatuidae

Psittacidae

Strigopidae

Sphenisciformes

Spheniscidae

Strigiformes

Strigidae

Tytonidae

Suliformes

Phalacrocoracidae

Sulidae

Cephalaspidomorphi

Petromyzontiformes

Petromyzontidae

Chondrichthyes

Carcharhiniformes

Carcharhinidae

Pentanchidae

Sphyrnidae

Triakidae

Lamniformes

Cetorhinidae

Lamnidae

Myliobatiformes

Aetobatidae

Dasyatidae

Myliobatidae

Orectolobiformes

Rhincodontidae

Stegostomidae

Rajiformes

Arhynchobatidae

Mobulidae

Potamotrygonidae

Rajidae

Rhinopteridae

Torpedinidae

Urolophidae

Rhinopristiformes

Glaucostegidae

Pristidae

Rhinidae

Rhinobatidae

Squaliformes

Centrophoridae

Squalidae

Squatiniformes

Squatinidae

Mammalia

Afrosoricida

Chrysochloridae

Tenrecidae

Carnivora

Ailuridae

Canidae

Eupleridae

Felidae

Mustelidae

Otariidae

Phocidae

Procyonidae

Viverridae

Cetartiodactyla

Balaenidae

Balaenopteridae

Bovidae

Cervidae

Delphinidae

Giraffidae

Hippopotamidae

Moschidae

Phocoenidae

Physeteridae

Platanistidae

Suidae

Tayassuidae

Tragulidae

Chiroptera

Emballonuridae

Hipposideridae

Miniopteridae

Molossidae

Mormoopidae

Phyllostomidae

Pteropodidae

Rhinolophidae

Rhinopomatidae

Vespertilionidae

Dasyuromorphia

Dasyuridae

Myrmecobiidae

Diprotodontia

Macropodidae

Petauridae

Phalangeridae

Potoroidae

Eulipotyphla

Erinaceidae

Solenodontidae

Soricidae

Talpidae

Lagomorpha

Leporidae

Ochotonidae

Macroscelidea

Macroscelididae

Peramelemorphia

Peramelidae

Perissodactyla

Equidae

Tapiridae

Pholidota

Manidae

Primates

Atelidae

Callitrichidae

Cebidae

Cercopithecidae

Cheirogaleidae

Daubentoniidae

Galagidae

Hominidae

Hylobatidae

Indriidae

Lemuridae

Lepilemuridae

Lorisidae

Pitheciidae

Tarsiidae

Proboscidea

Elephantidae

Rodentia

Capromyidae

Chinchillidae

Cricetidae

Ctenomyidae

Dasyproctidae

Dipodidae

Echimyidae

Geomyidae

Heteromyidae

Muridae

Nesomyidae

Sciuridae

Spalacidae

Scandentia

Tupaiidae

Sirenia

Trichechidae

Myxini

Myxiniformes

Myxinidae

Reptilia

Squamata

Agamidae

Amphisbaenidae

Anguidae

Anniellidae

Boidae

Bolyeridae

Calamariidae

Carphodactylidae

Chamaeleonidae

Colubridae

Cordylidae

Crotaphytidae

Dactyloidae

Diplodactylidae

Dipsadidae

Elapidae

Eublepharidae

Gekkonidae

Gerrhosauridae

Gymnophthalmidae

Homalopsidae

Hoplocercidae

Iguanidae

Lacertidae

Lamprophiidae

Leiosauridae

Leptotyphlopidae

Liolaemidae

Natricidae

Phrynosomatidae

Phyllodactylidae

Pseudoxyrhophiidae

Pygopodidae

Scincidae

Shinisauridae

Sphaerodactylidae

Teiidae

Tropiduridae

Typhlopidae

Uropeltidae

Varanidae

Viperidae

Xantusiidae

Xenosauridae

Testudines

Chelidae

Cheloniidae

Emydidae

Geoemydidae

Platysternidae

Testudinidae

Trionychidae

Cnidaria

Anthozoa

Actinaria

Actiniidae

Pennatulacea

Pennatulidae

Scleractinia

Acroporidae

Faviidae

Fungiidae

Meandrinidae

Merulinidae

Mussidae

Pectiniidae

Pocilloporidae

Poritidae

Hydrozoa

Milleporina

Milleporidae

Echinodermata

Holothuroidea

Aspidochirotida

Holothuriidae

Stichopodidae

Mollusca

Bivalvia

Unionida

Etheriidae

Hyriidae

Iridinidae

Margaritiferidae

Unionidae

Venerida

Cyrenidae

Sphaeriidae

Cephalopoda

Octopoda

Cirroctopodidae

Opisthoteuthidae

Gastropoda

Allogastropoda

Valvatidae

Architaenioglossa

Ampullariidae

Cyclophoridae

Diplommatinidae

Maizaniidae

Neocyclotidae

Viviparidae

Cycloneritimorpha

Helicinidae

Neritidae

Hygrophila

Lymnaeidae

Planorbidae

Littorinimorpha

Assimineidae

Bithyniidae

Cochliopidae

Hydrobiidae

Littorinidae

Moitessieriidae

Pomatiidae

Pomatiopsidae

Stenothyridae

Neogastropoda

Conidae

Sorbeoconcha

Melanopsidae

Pachychilidae

Paludomidae

Pleuroceridae

Semisulcospiridae

Thiaridae

Stylommatophora

Acavidae

Achatinellidae

Amastridae

Ariophantidae

Athoracophoridae

Camaenidae

Cerastidae

Charopidae

Chlamydephoridae

Clausiliidae

Cochlicellidae

Cochlicopidae

Endodontidae

Enidae

Euconulidae

Ferussaciidae

Helicarionidae

Helicidae

Helicodontidae

Helminthoglyptidae

Hygromiidae

Lauriidae

Limacidae

Orculidae

Orthalicidae

Oxychilidae

Parmacellidae

Partulidae

Polygyridae

Pristilomatidae

Rhytididae

Sphincterochilidae

Streptaxidae

Strophocheilidae

Subulinidae

Succineidae

Trochomorphidae

Urocyclidae

Valloniidae

Vertiginidae

Vitrinidae

Zonitidae

Systellommatophora

Veronicellidae

Vetigastropoda

Haliotidae

Nemertina

Enopla

Hoplonemertea

Prosorhochmidae

Onychophora

Onychophora

Onychophora

Peripatidae

Peripatopsidae

References

Animalia